
Ferreira may refer to:

People
 Ferreira (surname)
 Ferreira (footballer, born 1979), Josiesley Ferreira Rosa, Brazilian football striker
 Ferreira (footballer, born 1984), Antonio Ferreira de Oliveira Junior, Brazilian football centre-back
 Ferreira (footballer, born 1997), Aldemir dos Santos Ferreira, Brazilian football forward

Places

Argentina
 Ferreyra, in Córdoba Province, Argentina

Brazil
 Leandro Ferreira, municipality in Minas Gerais, Brazil
 Porto Ferreira, in the state of São Paulo, Brazil
 Estádio Aluízio Ferreira, a soccer stadium located in Porto Velho, Brazil

Portugal
 Ferreira do Alentejo, a municipality in the district of Beja
 Ferreira do Zêzere, a municipality in the district of Santarém District
 Ferreira (Macedo de Cavaleiros), a parish in the municipality of Macedo de Cavaleiros
 Ferreira (Paços de Ferreira), a parish in the municipality of Paços de Ferreira
 Ferreira (Paredes de Coura), a parish in the municipality of Paredes de Coura

South Africa
 Ferreirasdorp, a town in the greater Johannesburg Metro area

Spain
 Ferreira, Spain, a municipality of Granada Province, Spain (old Galician settlement)
 Ferreira, Coristanco, a parish in the municipality of Coristanco, Galicia
 Ferreira, San Sadurniño, a parish in the municipality of San Sadurniño, Galicia
 Ferreira, O Valadouro, a parish in the municipality of O Valadouro, Galicia
 Ferreira de Negral, a parish in the municipality of Palas de Rei, Galicia
 Ferreira de Pallares, a parish in the municipality of Guntín, Galicia
 Ferreira de Pantón, a parish in the municipality of Pantón, Galicia

Other
Ferreira, the name from 1895 to 1916 of the clipper ship originally named Cutty Sark